The 1999–2000 season was Juventus Football Club's 102nd in existence and 98th consecutive season in the top flight of Italian football.

Season review
Juventus came close to adding to its collection of league titles, but in the end, a controversial refereeing decision denied them the title.

Juventus led 1–0 at home to Parma in their penultimate match. Parma made a huge effort to equalise, and thought they had got the desired goal when Fabio Cannavaro headed the ball into the back of the net during stoppage time. However, referee Massimo De Santis discovered a foul that was only apparent to him and, despite wild protest from the Parma players, the goal was disallowed.

On the last day of the season, title rivals Lazio beat Reggina by 3–0 at home, but Juventus unexpectedly ran into problems at Perugia, where the heavens opened at 0–0 in half-time. Referee Pierluigi Collina nonetheless decided to kick off the game, albeit half an hour too late. Nervous Laziali and players followed the Perugia–Juventus game via radio, hoping that Juventus would be defeated. A draw would mean a re-match between the sides to decide the title, while a win would give Juventus another scudetto. The Juventus players' efforts were in vain, since Alessandro Calori struck a half-volley into the back of the net with half an hour to go. With Juventus unable to reply, they lost the title in the final round of the season.

It was a bitter end to the season for the Turin club, who had led the table for most of the campaign and lost just one of their first 26 matches, only to collapse in the final 8 games (4 losses suffered in those games). To make matters worse, Juventus had endured a humiliating UEFA Cup run, being beaten 4–0 and eliminated in the round of 16 by Spanish club Celta Vigo. This was their earliest exit from European competitions since the 1987–88 UEFA Cup.

Players

Squad information

Transfers

Competitions

Serie A

League table

Results summary

Results by round

Matches

Coppa Italia

Round of 16

Quarter-finals

UEFA Intertoto Cup

Third round

Semi-finals

Final

UEFA Cup

First round

Second round

Third round

Fourth round

Statistics

Players statistics

Goalscorers

Serie A
  Filippo Inzaghi 15
  Alessandro Del Piero 9 (8)
  Darko Kovačević 6
  Antonio Conte 4
  Zinedine Zidane 4

Coppa Italia

UEFA Intertoto Cup

UEFA Cup

References

Juventus F.C. seasons
Juventus